Fandy Mochtar (born 19 May 1984) is an former Indonesian professional footballer.

Club career 
On December 6, 2014, he signed with Pusamania Borneo.

International career 
He made his debut for Indonesia on November 9, 2007 against Syria as substitute. He has won eight caps for the Indonesia national football team.

Honours 
Sriwijaya
Winner
 Indonesian Inter Island Cup: 2012

References

External links 
 
 

Indonesian footballers
1984 births
Living people
Sportspeople from North Maluku
People from Ternate
Persiter Ternate players
Persibom Bolaang Mongondow players
Arema F.C. players
Persisam Putra Samarinda players
Sriwijaya F.C. players
Persiba Balikpapan players
Borneo F.C. players
Indonesian Premier Division players
Liga 1 (Indonesia) players
Indonesia international footballers
Association football fullbacks
Association football wingers
Footballers at the 2006 Asian Games
Asian Games competitors for Indonesia